Amédée Ernest Lynen (1852–1938), who often signed his works Am. Lynen, was a Belgian painter, illustrator and writer. In 1880, he was one of the founders of the artistic group L'Essor after it had separated from the academy, and he co-founded its successor Pour l'Art in 1892. In 1895, he founded the "Compagnie du Diable-au-corps", an artistic association which organised evenings with theatre and poetry, and which existed at least until 1899. It also published a satirical newspaper, Le Diable au Corps. In 1903, two works on paper were bought by the Royal Museums of Fine Arts of Belgium. In 1930, a retrospective of his works was organised by the Cercle Artistique et Littéraire in the Vauxhall, Brussels.

Works

 Wrote and illustrated Sébastien Vranckx, peintre de moeurs escarmouches et combats (1901, published by Lamertin)
 Wrote and illustrated Le jaquemart de la tour du pré-rouge (1902, published by Lamertin)
 Wrote and illustrated L'Oeuvre de Maîtrise (1918, Goossens), with a foreword by Georges Eekhoud
 The poster for the 1902 Exposition des primitifs flamands à Bruges
 Posters for exhibitions, performances and festivities

Illustrations for books
Among the many works with one or more illustrations by Lynen can be cited: 
 Le Théâtrè a la Maison by Émile Leclercq
 La femme de Roland by Pierre Elzéar (1882, published by Kistemaeckers)
 First impression of À vau-l'eau by Joris-Karl Huysmans (1882, published by Kistemaeckers)
 Contes érotico-philosophiques by Antoine Aimé Beaufort d'Auberval (1882, published by Kistemaeckers)
 Au pays de Manneken-Pis by Theodore Hannon  (1883, published by Kistemaeckers)
 Le cheveu, conte moral by Simon Coiffier de Moret  (1883, published by Kistemaeckers)
 Noëls fin-de-siècle by Theodore Hannon  (1892)
 Guide de la section de l'état indépendant du Congo à l'exposition de Bruxelles-Tervueren en 1897
 Les vertus bourgeoises by Henri Carton de Wiart (1912, Van Oest)
 More than 250 illustrations for The Legend of Thyl Ulenspiegel and Lamme Goedzak by Charles De Coster (1914, published by Lamertin)
 L'Enseignement Professionnel En Belgique, 1921

Notes

External links
 

1852 births
1938 deaths
People from Saint-Josse-ten-Noode
19th-century Belgian painters
19th-century Belgian male artists
20th-century Belgian painters
Académie Royale des Beaux-Arts alumni
20th-century Belgian male artists